Margo Consuela Bors (born 1942) is an American painter, muralist, photographer and illustrator active in the San Francisco Bay area. She is an activist for protecting native plants and animals is supported by big organizations like the California Native Plant Society.

Early life and education
Bors completed her Bachelor's of Art in 1963, at the University of Rochester, New York. In 1992, she attained her foreign studies degree at the University of Mexico, Mexico City. Later she trained in Asian Art and the Asian Art Museum and in the Native Arts of Africa, Oceana and at the de Young Museum in San Francisco, California. In 1976, Bors began independent studies in fine arts at San Francisco  City College.

Career 
Bors is a muralist, painter and photographer based in Portero Hill, San Francisco, California. Bors has created murals with Precita eyes muralists and has collaborated with artists Luis and Susan Cervantes and Tony Parrinello. Her aesthetic style is based on her knowledge of the native plants and animals of California. Bors used this knowledge to give a presentation at the San Francisco Botanical Gardens. She has studied and showcased her photography. Bors has given tours of Bayview Hill as well as other national parks. Her photography consists of mostly botanical and native plants and animals primarily from the Bay Area. Bors has illustrated lino prints in the portfolio, Gardening Out Loud, by Judith S. Offer. Bors has contributed 700 Native plant photos to CalPhotos, which is part of the UC digital library.

Artwork

Paintings 
Red Tulips Red Tulips, is a centered piece that contains overlapping flowers that appear fully grown. The red tulips are in an urn, decorated with images of fishes whirlpools and water flowers. The median used for this art piece is linocut, the piece is a 30 x 21 print.

Sunflowers and Mayan Cloth In Sunflowers and Mayan Cloth, Bors uses watercolor to depict a clear vase that holds sunflowers. The vase is place on a cloth, which is the Mayan Cloth. On the Mayan cloth, there is multiple patterns that are being use. More flowers are shown on the cloth, as well as zigzags, triangles, and boxes. They are place vertically on the cloth, the flowers, then the triangles, then the zigzags, and so on and so forth. The cloth is flat, though the vase and flowers do not look flat. This piece represents symbolism and naturalism. The front of the cloth lies flatly in space, while the backside of the cloth is missing because it has fallen with gravity on the table.

Pink LiliesThis art piece is 9 x 8 in. She used the method etching to create Pink Lilies. Bors used etching to create a print impression. The urn in which the lilies are in, is covered with more flowers. The vase is not centered and there is piece of the urn that is shown in the back of the image. The lilies are sprouting from the urn and seem to cover most of the space in the image. The background is blank and the piece focuses on the lilies that are sprouting from the vase.

Murals 
Bors has created murals all over the San Francisco area. Murals often consists of different artists and not one person is given credit for the whole piece. Bors has helped paint many murals like the murals for the Cesar Chavez School (1995), The San Francisco State University, The Bryant School, 1989 and The Herrick Hospital in Berkeley, California, 1981. In 1982, she painted a mural that depicted Potrero Hill and its history. This mural was created at the entrance of the Potrero Branch Library. The mural shows hills, trees and houses to show what is around this area.

Photography 
Most of Bors' photographs are private and only available for CalPhotos. Bors' photographs consist of botanical life and likes to include in her photos images of insects like spiders, butterflies, Damselflies, and bees. Her photos are used by groups like the Sierra Club who is an organization who tries to help persevere the environment. The intentions of her photographs is to embrace the beauty of nature and express the importance of native plants and animals.

Exhibitions

Solo exhibitions
 University of California, Medical Center, San Francisco, California, 1995
 HCR Library of Horticulture, San Francisco, California, 1995
 Garibaldi Gallery, San Francisco, California, 1992
 Gramercy Towers, San Francisco, California, 1984
 August 22–31, 2016 - Bors exhibited her piece of art, Rare Johnny-Jump-Ups Viola pedunculata and Callippe Silverspot from San Bruno Mountain at Helen Crocker Russel Botanical Gardens Library, San Francisco, California.
 March 2, 1983 - San Francisco, City of St. Francis with Margo Bors Potrero exhibition located at Branch Library, San Francisco, California. 
 San Francisco's Helen Crocker Russell Botanical Library

Group exhibitions
 Stanwood Gallery, San Francisco, California 1995
 Triton Museum of Art, Santa Clara, California, 1994
 Luther Burbank Center, Santa Rosa, California, 1994 
 Galeria Museo, San Francisco, California, 1993
 Arts Concepts Gallery, Walnut Creek, California, 1992
 Berkeley Art Center Gallery, Berkeley California, 1991
 Gumps Gallery, San Francisco, California, 1991 
 U.S- U.K exchange exhibit with Barbecan Centre, London England, 1989 
 Banaker Gallery, San Francisco, California, 1987
 Civic Center, San Francisco, California, 1981

Collections 
Bor's linocut print, California Poppies, is acquired by Library of Congress.

Awards 
The California Native Plant Society has awarded Bors with the Certificate of Excellence in botanical art

Publications 
Bors has illustrated and collaborated with Judith S. Offer to create the 1996 book, Gardening Out Loud. The book includes various poems written by Offer along with images created by Bors. Bors linoprints in the book include abstract images of flowers and plants. Some of the poems in Gardening Out Loud are Purple Iris, Stumped? and ARGIOPE TRIFASIATA. These poems are based on Judith S. Offer's experience in gardening and volunteer work with the National Native Plant Society.

Bibliography 
 "Artist Profile." ArtSpan, www.artspan.org/artist/margobors.
 "Featured Artists." The Mission, missionbooksf.com/featured-artists.
 Henkes, Robert. Latin American Women Artists of the United States: The Works of 33 Twentieth-Century Women. Jefferson, N.C: McFarland, 1999.
 Linenthal, Peter, and Abigail Johnston. San Francisco's Potrero Hill. Charleston, SC: Arcadia, 2005. Print.
 Offer, Judith S., and Margo Consuelo. Bors. Gardening out Loud. Pleasant Hill Press, 1998.
 Photographer Margo Bors, calphotos.berkeley.edu/cgi/photographer_query?where-name_full=Margo%2BBors&one=T.

References

Citations

Works cited

General sources
 "California Native Plant Society (CNPS)." California Native Plant Society. N.p., n.d. Web. May 27, 2019.
 "Protect the Future." Sierra Club. N.p., May 22, 2019. Web. May 27, 2019.

External links
 http://www.margobors.com/mb_index.html

Living people
1942 births
20th-century American women artists
21st-century American women artists
Date of birth missing (living people)
Place of birth missing (living people)
Artists from San Francisco
Painters from California
American muralists
American women painters
Women muralists
Environmental artists
University of Rochester alumni